Bani Buhair in Saudi Arabia is a southern tribe that traces back to the sub-tribe Bani Rizq falling under the mother tribe, Bilqarn. It covers an area of about 237 square kilometers and is located east and south of Al Qunfudhah in Makkah governorate. The population ranges from 20,000 to 21,000 Buhairis, divided into two primary communities: Alabadilah and Alwohoob. Two sheikhs are named for the tribe: Mwanis bin Saad (Al-abadilah) and Moussa Mubarak (Alwohoob).

Location 
The borders of Bani Buhair are marked beyond Al-Ghabra, a small village inhabited by people from Bani Suhaim tribe. Primarily, Bani Buhair includes Furi Alabadilah on the Mount Inanin where small villages are also scattered such as Alsahnah and Alghamrah. The tribe embraces Alriyan (or Afas), Alwasha, and various parts of Bilharith region, i.e. Talaaa on the southern bank of Wadi Qanuna, a well-known wadi in Al Ordyaitain. The main residence of Bani Buhair is Alfaija where Suq Alrabu is located, a small market weekly visited by neighboring tribes on Wednesdays. Westwards, a handful of isolated villages are seen such as Hadrah, Hamdah, Siqarin, Musawi down to the outskirts of Mount Safa, a key feature on the western border of the tribe.

History 
The history of Bani Buhair is a matter of discussion to date. Hamad Aljasir has not proposed a link for Bani Buhair within the tribal tree of Balqarn. On the basis of inaccurate historical account, however, Abdullah Alrizqi (2008) provides various hypotheses to account for the etymological origin of the word Buahir: (1) it has been suggested that Buhair is a person from the Yemeni tribe Tayy, who was well-renowned for hospitality and courage. (2) Buhair may be a treaty title signed between alliances in the region. (3) Bani Buhair (translated as the sons of a small sea) were initially immigrants from Bani Rizq down to wadi Qanuna. The ancestors perceived wadi qanuna wide enough as Buhair (lit. a small sea), and they named themselves after the wadi.

Culture 
Culture of Bani Buhair does not hold worth-mentioning aspects. However, three cultural practices from religious and social perspectives are dominant in the tribe: circumcision, Zoroastrianism (religious practices) and night courtship (social practice). Bani Buhair people used to postpone the time of circumcision at a late age, mostly beyond the age of puberty. A young man strips himself of all his clothes and calls out the neighboring tribes for a show. As the tribes come together, the young man announces his willingness for circumcision and addresses a long sermon that highlights accounts of his ancestors’ glory. He puts up a small stick in his hand while a slave performs the circumcision. The young man must maintain balance until the process is complete. Then his tribe comes near to lift him on shoulders in pride. It has been reported, however, that a couple of people passed out during the circumcision.

Sky-related practices to mention a few are also observed in Bani Buhair culture. They are claimed to be remnants of Zoroastrianism. For example, when a person loses a tooth, they throw it to the sun in hope of a substitute.  They say “O sun, please accept this tooth of a donkey and grant me a tooth of a deer.” Another practice is attested during the lunar eclipse; villagers fill barrels with water to reduce the so-called heat of the moon. During night, children are also discouraged from counting stars. They believe the counted stars leave acne on the private body parts.

Dating 'night courtship' was a common act in the past. However, it has been islamically forbidden later on. In the past, a man was allowed to visit houses and ask fathers about the health of their daughters.  Dating takes place in the house, and it is confined to marriage plans.

See also
Bani Shehr

References

Tribes of Arabia
Tribes of Saudi Arabia